is the first live video album by Japanese singer/songwriter Aimer. Recorded live at the Nippon Budokan on August 29, 2017, the album was released on December 13, 2017 on SME Records in two versions: a limited Blu-ray+CD edition and a regular Blu-ray-only edition. The Blu-ray includes the bonus short film "sólin", which was shot in Iceland.

Track listing
Blu-ray

CD

Charts
Weekly charts

References

External links 
  (Aimer-web)
  (agehasprings)
  (Sony Music Entertainment Japan)
 
 Aimer Live in Budokan "blanc et noir" at VGMdb

Aimer albums
2017 live albums
2017 video albums
Japanese-language live albums
SME Records albums
Live video albums
Albums recorded at the Nippon Budokan